Minya Sporting Club, is an Egyptian football club based in El Minya, Egypt. The club is currently playing in the Egyptian Second Division, the second-highest league in the Egyptian football league system.

Current squad
Egyptian Football Association (EFA) rules are that a team may only have 3 foreign born players in the squad.

External links

Egyptian Second Division
Football clubs in Egypt
1928 establishments in Egypt
Association football clubs established in 1928